The Hospital of St Mary, Domus Dei, or Maison Dieu (Latin/Norman French – house of God), is a medieval building in Dover, England which forms the oldest part of Dover Town Hall. The Town Hall and remains of mediaeval Maison Dieu were Grade I listed in 1973.

History

Foundation in XIIIth century 
Mason Dieu was founded in 1203 by Hubert de Burgh, the Constable of Dover Castle, as the "Hospital of the Mason Dieu" to accommodate pilgrims coming from the Continent to visit the shrine of Thomas Becket in Canterbury Cathedral. de Burgh gave the manors of River and Kingsdown to the hospital in order to fund it. Simon de Wardune also gave some land.

The original buildings consisted of one large hall with a kitchen and living quarters attached for the Master and Brethren who 'practised hospitality to all strangers'. The hospital accommodated permanent pensioners and other wounded and poor soldiers, as well as pilgrims.

In 1227, a chapel was added and Henry III attended its consecration.  Today, this chapel survives as a courtroom, having been converted in the nineteenth century by the town council of Dover. A "Great Chamber", built in 1253, is thought to be the present 'Stone Hall', which has interesting stained glass and contains the town corporation's civic paintings, Cinque Ports Volunteers regimental flags, arms, and armour.

St Edmund's Chapel was built next to the Maison Dieu and became a place of pilgrimage after the canonisation of Richard of Chichester in 1262.

Dissolution in 1534
When the Master and Brethren of the Hall signed an oath accepting Henry VIII's Act of Supremacy, declaring him the Head of the Church of England, in 1534, the institution's religious role ended. Ten years later, the building was surrendered to the Crown and (with its nearby subsidiary St Edmund's Chapel) was utilized by the navy and army, as a supplies base, until 1830.

19th century 
In 1834, the building was sold to the Corporation of Dover who used the Maison Dieu as the Town Hall. At first, the building was used by the Town Council with minimal restorations. Eventually, the Council turned the old chapel into a courtroom and built a prison below. The Council decided to fully restore the building, and in 1851 they agreed to implement renovations suggested by Victorian architect Ambrose Poynter.

After seven years of fundraising for the project, William Burges, another famous Victorian architect, funded almost entirely by the council, began work on the restoration project. Burges's admiration of the original mediaeval style can be seen in such parts of his renovation as grotesque animals and in the coats of arms incorporated into his new designs.

Burges designed the Council Chamber at the end of the hall added in 1867 and in 1881 began work on a town meeting and concert hall. The new building, on the site of the old prison, contained meeting rooms and mayoral and official offices. While William Burges designed the project, parts were completed after his death by Pullan and Chapple, his partners.

Since the 19th century 
In 1939, with the outbreak of the Second World War, the building's stained-glass windows were removed to be protected until the end of the conflict.

The Town Hall and remains of mediaeval Maison Dieu were Grade I listed in 1973. Maison Dieu House was Grade II* listed in 1949. Maison Dieu is also a Scheduled Monument. A renovation programme work carried out from 2020 has uncovered much of Burges's decorative scheme, which is to be restored and reinstated.

The Maison Dieu continues to be used as one of the main meeting halls in Dover, as well as being open to public use for functions such as conferences, weddings, fairs, concerts, theatrical performances and the annual White Cliffs Winter Ales Festival. It remains the meeting place of Dover Town Council.

Stained-glass windows 
In the Stone Hall, above the entrance, is a large stained-glass window representing the benefactors of the building, with Hubert de Burgh in the centre wearing a surcoat with his armorial bearings. Henri II and Henri III stand on the right side of de Burgh, Henri IV on the left side. The windows were a gift by Mrs Mary Bell (cousin and benefactor of William Kingsford, owner of Maison Dieu upon his death in 1856) in the 19th century. The windows were produced by William Wailes in 1856. The windows in the south wall were designed by Edward Poynter.

References

External links
Local history page

1203 establishments in England
Buildings and structures in Dover, Kent
History of Dover, Kent
William Burges buildings
City and town halls in Kent
Buildings and structures completed in 1203
Grade I listed buildings in Kent